Ricki-Lee is the debut studio album by Australian recording artist Ricki-Lee Coulter, released through Shock Records on 3 October 2005. Coulter recorded the album in Melbourne and worked with several songwriters and producers, including Audius Mtawarira, Israel Cruz, Jarrad Rogers, Hayley Aitken and Kara DioGuardi, among others. The album reached number 30 on the ARIA Albums Chart and number six on the ARIA Urban Albums Chart. Ricki-Lee was preceded by the lead single "Hell No!" in June 2005, which peaked at number five on the ARIA Singles Chart and was certified gold by the Australian Recording Industry Association (ARIA). The second single "Sunshine" was released in September 2005, which peaked at number eight and was also certified gold. "Breathe" was released as the album's third and final single in January 2006, which reached number 14.

Background and reception
Following her departure from Australian Idol in 2004, Coulter was offered recording contracts by record labels including the show's sponsor Sony BMG, but she signed with Australia's biggest independent label Shock Records. Coulter explained, "I'd met with a number of labels and Shock were the only one that asked me what I wanted to do and what kind of album I wanted to make and who I wanted to work with". She recorded her debut album in Melbourne. Ricki-Lee was released on 3 October 2005, as both digital download and CD formats.

Matthew Chisling of Allmusic gave the album three out of five stars, and was critical of its musical direction. He added that "the album never truly solidifies Coulter enough to warrant her immediate approval by a widespread audience, since she is divided so heavily between styles and influences that don't always suit her". Guy Blackman of The Age stated that the album is "an infectious collection of R&B-tinged pop tunes that takes a step beyond the usual Idol fodder". At the 2006 Australian and New Zealand Urban Music Awards, Ricki-Lee was nominated for Best R&B Album. Ricki-Lee debuted and peaked on the ARIA Albums Chart at number 30 on 10 October 2005. The album performed better on the ARIA Urban Albums Chart, where it peaked at number six.

Track listing

Notes
(*) Denotes co-producer

Charts

Release history

References 

2005 debut albums
Ricki-Lee Coulter albums